Nant-y-derry is a village in the county of Monmouthshire, Wales, located six miles south east of Abergavenny and four miles northwest of Usk.

History and amenities

The River Usk flows close by and the area is a rural agricultural part of the county.

Nant-y-Derry’s manor house, the Neoclassical Llanfair Grange, was the home of Harry Llewellyn in the mid-20th century. The Foxhunter Inn, a local pub, is named in honour of Llewellyn's famous horse, Foxhunter.

Celebrity chef and Market Kitchen presenter Matt Tebbutt, owns the Foxhunter and run it as a gastropub. Tebbutt tried to sell the pub in 2011 due to his busy television schedule, however following reaction from local residents he decided to take it off the market.

Nantyderry Sunshine
Chrysanthemum 'Nantyderry Sunshine' is an herbaceous perennial to 90 cm in height, compact and bushy in habit, with button-like bright lemon-yellow flowers 3 cm in width, the inner florets tipped with deep orange-yellow. Breeding has led to many classifications amongst this group, some being good garden plants, others the preserve of the Chrysanthemum enthusiast and the show bench.

See also
Nantyderry railway station

References

External links
 Kelly's 1901 Directory of Monmouthshire on Goytre and Nantyderry

Villages in Monmouthshire